The 2021 Rochester mayoral election was held on November 2, 2021. Incumbent Democratic mayor Lovely Warren ran for reelection to a third term in office but was defeated in the Democratic primary by city councilman Malik Evans.

Background
In 2017, incumbent mayor Lovely Warren was investigated by the New York State Board of Elections for purported campaign finance violations related to two PACs created for her 2017 mayoral bid. It was alleged that Warren attempted to use the two PACs to subvert contribution limits. In October 2020, Monroe County District Attorney Sandra Doorley announced that a Monroe County grand jury voted to indict Warren and two officials who worked on her 2017 reelection campaign on charges related to these accusations. Warren described the investigation as a "political witch hunt" and plead not guilty to the charges.

Warren had previously faced controversy after the March 2020 killing of Daniel Prude at the hands of Rochester police and her failure to publicly comment on the investigation into it. On March 12, 2021, a probe by the city council determined that Mayor Warren and then-Rochester Chief of Police La'Ron Singletary concealed critical details about Prude's death from the public and lied about their knowledge of the case.

On May 19, 2021, Warren's husband Timothy Granison was stopped on the road by New York state troopers, who found a large quantity of cocaine in his car. Police then searched Warren and her husband's home, finding an unregistered handgun. Granison was charged with three felonies: criminal possession of a controlled substance, criminal possession of a controlled substance with intent to sell, and criminal possession of an unregistered firearm. He pleaded not guilty to all three charges and was released on his own recognizance. Granison was one of seven people who were arrested as part of a larger investigation by the Rochester Police Department into the presence and proliferation of illegal drugs within the city. Warren, who is separated from her husband, maintained her innocence and claimed that the investigation was politically motivated. As evidence of this she pointed out that her husband's trial was set for June 21, one day before the Democratic primary, even though that date was actually requested by her husband's lawyer.

Democratic primary
Evans declared his candidacy on Martin Luther King Jr. Day 2021. Upon his entry into the race, Warren's campaign released the following statement:

Warren was the only candidate to seek the endorsement of the Rochester Democratic Committee, and received it on February 8, winning 63% of the committee members' votes. Although Evans chose not to participate in the endorsement process, saying he wished to "avoid the divisiveness of internal Democratic Party politics," he still received 31% of the votes.

Candidates

Declared
Malik Evans, at-large city councillor and former president of the Rochester Board of Education
Lovely Warren, incumbent mayor (endorsed by committee)

Endorsements

Polling

Results
The Democratic primary was held on June 22. Malik Evans defeated the incumbent mayor in a landslide victory.

General election
As no other parties other than the Democratic and Working Families Party (who endorsed Evans) filed to run Evans ran unopposed in the general election.

Results

References

External links
Official websites for mayoral candidates
 Malik Evans (D) for Mayor
 Lovely Warren (D) for Mayor 

2021 New York (state) elections
Mayoral elections in Rochester, New York
Rochester
2021 in New York (state)